Anthophagini is a tribe of ocellate rove beetles in the family Staphylinidae. There are at least 20 genera and 20 described species in Anthophagini.

Genera
These 22 genera belong to the tribe Anthophagini:

 Acidota Stephens, 1829 c g b
 Amphichroum Kraatz, 1857 c g b
 Anthobium b
 Arpedium Erichson, 1839 g b
 Artochia Casey, 1893 g b
 Brathinus LeConte, 1852 c g b
 Deinopteroloma Jansson, 1947 c g b
 Eucnecosum Reitter, 1909 c g b
 Geodromicus Redtenbacher, 1857 c g b
 Lesteva (Lesteva) erythra Ma & Li c g b
 Microedus Leconte, 1874 g b
 Olophrum Erichson, 1839 c g b
 Omalorphanus Campbell & Chandler, 1987 b
 Orobanus Leconte, 1878 g b
 Orochares Kraatz, 1858 g b
 Pelecomalium Casey, 1886 g b
 Phlaeopterus Motschoulsky, 1853 g b
 Porrhodites Kraatz, 1858 g b
 Tanyrhinus Mannerheim, 1852 g b
 Trigonodemus LeConte, 1863 c g b
 Unamis Casey, 1893 g b
 Xenicopoda Moore & Legner, 1971 b

Data sources: i = ITIS, c = Catalogue of Life, g = GBIF, b = Bugguide.net

References

Further reading

External links

 

Omaliinae
Beetle tribes